Marina 106, also known as the 106 Tower, is a supertall residential skyscraper, partially constructed but currently on hold, in Dubai, UAE. The building is planned to rise  in the Dubai Marina, with 106 floors. The building was originally planned to be completed in 2019. Marina 106 was designed by the National Engineering Bureau, and is being developed by Emaar Properties.

History
Marina 106 was proposed in 2008 as a  tower. Groundbreaking occurred in 2009.  However, the foundation was not completed before the 2009 Dubai debt standstill and the ensuing property bust put the project on hold. During this period, the project was redesigned, gaining  to become 445m. Construction restarted in December 2, 2013, but it was halted again in April 11, 2017.

See also
List of tallest buildings in Dubai
List of buildings with 100 floors or more

References

External links
 Skyscraper Center
 Building Radar

Proposed skyscrapers in Dubai